Jozef Schwendtner (born 1 July 1963) is a Slovak wrestler. He competed in the men's freestyle 57 kg at the 1988 Summer Olympics.

References

1963 births
Living people
Slovak male sport wrestlers
Olympic wrestlers of Czechoslovakia
Wrestlers at the 1988 Summer Olympics
Sportspeople from Dunajská Streda